A Daughter of Eve is a 1919 British silent crime film directed by Walter West and starring Violet Hopson, Stewart Rome and Cameron Carr. Ronald Colman made an early screen appearance. The film is now considered a lost film.

Cast
 Violet Hopson — Jessica Bond
 Stewart Rome — Sidney Strangeways
 Cameron Carr — Charles Strangeways
 Ralph Forster — John Bond
 Edward Banfield — Sir Hugh Strangeways
 Vesta Sylva — Jessica as a Child
 Ronald Colman — Minor role

See also
List of lost films

References

External links

A Daughter of Eve at SilentEra 

1919 films
1919 crime films
British crime films
British silent feature films
Broadwest films
Films directed by Walter West
Lost British films
British black-and-white films
Lost crime films
1910s English-language films
1910s British films